LPG may refer to:

Science
 Liquefied petroleum gas, a flammable mixture of hydrocarbon gases
 Lipophosphoglycan, a class of molecule found on the surface of some eukaryotes, in particular protozoa

Music groups
 La Perdita Generacio, a Swedish alternative rock band that sings in Esperanto
 LPG (Dutch band), a Dutch indie-pop band
 LPG (South Korean group) (Lovely Pretty Girls), South Korean girl group that debuted in 2005
 LPG (American band), an American Christian hip-hop group

Other uses
 Landwirtschaftliche Produktionsgenossenschaft (Agricultural Production Cooperative), the official designation for large, collectivised farms in former East Germany
 Llanfairpwll railway station (National Rail station code), Wales
 Lycée Paul-Gauguin, a secondary school in Papeete, Tahiti
 Liberal Party of Gibraltar, a political party in Gibraltar

See also
 Local Land and Property Gazetteer (LLPG)
 National Land and Property Gazetteer (NLPG)